The 2009 Verizon Festival of Speed was the fourth round of the 2009 Rolex Sports Car Series season. It took place at Mazda Raceway Laguna Seca on May 17, 2009.

Race results
Class Winners in bold.

Verizon Festival of Speed
Verizon Communications